The 1986 Winston 500 was a NASCAR Winston Cup Series race that took place on May 4, 1986, at Alabama International Motor Speedway in Talladega, Alabama.

Total earnings for each driver ranged from the winner's share of $77,905 ($ with inflation) to the last-place finisher's share of $5,135 ($ with inflation) out of a total purse of $499,905. ($ with inflation).

Background
Talladega Superspeedway, originally known as Alabama International Motor Superspeedway (AIMS), is a motorsports complex located north of Talladega, Alabama. It is located on the former Anniston Air Force Base in the small city of Lincoln. The track is a Tri-oval and was constructed by International Speedway Corporation, a business controlled by the France Family, in the 1960s. Talladega is most known for its steep banking and the unique location of the start/finish line - located just past the exit to pit road. The track currently hosts the NASCAR series such as the Sprint Cup Series, Xfinity Series, and the Camping World Truck Series.

Race report
Seven drivers failed to qualify for the race including: Mark Martin along with J. D. McDuffie, Davey Allison, and Alan Kulwicki.

Bill Elliott would win the pole position with a speed of 212.229mph, a track record, which he broke the following year with a speed of 212.809mph. The addition of restrictor plates starting in 1988 would eventually keep qualifying speeds below 200mph. There were nine cautions in the race; 24 different lead changes were made on the track. The race took more than three hours to complete.

The first half of the race was mostly a thrilling three-way battle between Dale Earnhardt, Bill Elliott, and Bobby Allison. No one else seemed to be able to run with the three, though many tried. Sterling Marlin was running well early until he shredded a tire going down the backstretch, eventually falling out of the race with a burnt piston. Kyle Petty may have had the fastest car on track, carving his way up to third place at one point. On lap 65, Petty was running inside the top 5 when Cale Yarborough blew an engine right in front of the pack. Petty went low top avoid the spinning Yarborough, clipped the infield grass on the backstretch, and spun up right in front of Geoff Bodine and Trevor Boys. Bodine piled into the side of Petty's Ford, while Boys went low and t-boned Yarborough. All four cars were eliminated, though Bodine and Petty would briefly return later on. Petty would eventually drop out after a second crash late in the event.

By halfway, Elliott, Allison, and Earnhardt were pretty much running by themselves. Darrell Waltrip looked as if he might be able to challenge the trio, but blew his motor on lap 104 while chasing the leaders down. Elliott would go on to dominate the second half of the race, as Earnhardt found himself unable to catch up to Elliott. With about 13 laps to go, Elliott suddenly slowed on track. For the second straight week in a row, his engine had expired. Bobby Allison, who had been drafting with Rick Wilson, inherited the lead briefly before the yellow came out for oil from Elliott's engine. Buddy Baker, having run midfield all day, took the lead on the restart. Baker, Allison, and Earnhardt enjoyed a good scrap for the lead over the last 10 laps, with Allison coming out on top after taking the lead with 6 to go. Debris in addition to three major accidents and an oil spill would contribute to delays in the race; about 22% of the race was run under a caution flag while the average green flag run was nearly 15 laps.

Bobby Allison (driving a 1986 Buick Regal) held off a last-lap pass attempt in the third turn by Dale Earnhardt to win by almost 0.2 seconds over Earnhardt in front of 133,000 people. Dale Earnhardt's second-place finish, combined with Darrell Waltrip's engine failure, led to Earnhardt taking control of the Winston Cup points lead, which he wouldn't relinquish for the rest of the year. Buddy Baker's third was his best result of the season, while Bobby Hillin Jr. and Phil Parsons scored career-best results of fourth and fifth respectively. Allison was 48 years old, making him one of the oldest drivers to ever win a NASCAR Cup Series racing event. Allison's win would be the first since the 1984 World 600. Tommy Gale would finish his NASCAR career with this race.

Jody Ridley received credit for his finish in last place due to an engine problem on the fourth lap of this 188-lap event. Ron Bouchard would lead his final lap in his Cup Series career; after winning the 1981 Talladega 500 as a rookie on the same track. Trevor Boys (Canada) was the only foreigner in the race.

A 20-year-old fan, Darren Charles Crowder stole the pace car of the race and took it for a joyride but was apprehended before completing two laps.

Qualifying

Finishing order
Section reference: 

 Bobby Allison
 Dale Earnhardt†
 Buddy Baker†
 Bobby Hillin Jr.
 Phil Parsons
 Morgan Shepherd
 Richard Petty
 Rick Wilson
 Ron Bouchard†
 Greg Sacks
 Dave Marcis
 Tim Richmond†
 Rusty Wallace
 Ronnie Thomas
 Doug Heveron
 Jimmy Means
 Joe Ruttman
 Pancho Carter
 Delma Cowart†
 Benny Parsons*†
 Harry Gant*
 Buddy Arrington
 Chet Fillip
 Bill Elliott*
 Tommy Gale†
 Ken Schrader
 Geoffrey Bodine
 Phil Barkdoll*
 Terry Labonte*
 Eddie Bierschwale*
 Kyle Petty*
 Tommy Ellis*
 Connie Saylor*†
 Darrell Waltrip*
 Michael Waltrip*
 Ricky Rudd*
 Cale Yarborough*
 Trevor Boys*
 Sterling Marlin*
 Neil Bonnett*†
 Jim Sauter*†
 Jody Ridley*

† signifies that the driver is known to be deceased 
* Driver failed to finish race

Standings after the race

References

Winston 500
Winston 500
NASCAR races at Talladega Superspeedway